The SGB Championship Riders' Individual Championship is an annual motorcycle speedway contest between the top riders (or two riders) with the highest average points total from each club competing in the SGB Championship.

Format
The same format of Championship applies for the tier one and tier three leagues, that of the SGB Premiership Riders' Individual Championship (tier one) and National League Riders' Championship (tier three).

History
The competition replaced the Premier League Riders Championship in 2017.

Winners

See also
List of United Kingdom Speedway League Riders' champions
 Speedway in the United Kingdom

References 

Speedway competitions in the United Kingdom